Shimia abyssi is a Gram-negative, rod-shaped, aerobic and non-motile bacterium from the genus of Shimia which has been isolated from sediments from the Sagami Bay in Japan.

References 

Rhodobacteraceae
Bacteria described in 2016